Alfonso Pastor Vacas (born 4 October 2000) is a Spanish professional footballer who plays as a goalkeeper for CD Castellón on loan from Sevilla FC.

Club career
Born in Bujalance, Seville, Andalusia, Pastor joined Sevilla FC's youth setup in 2013, after representing Séneca CF and AD FB de Bujalance. On 1 September 2018, while still a youth, he renewed his contract until 2021.

Pastor made his senior debut with the reserves on 30 March 2019, starting in a 1–0 Segunda División B home win against UD Almería B. Definitely promoted to the B-side for the 2019–20 campaign, he was mainly a first-choice as the season was curtailed due to the COVID-19 pandemic.

On 3 December 2020, as starter Bono tested positive to COVID-19 and immediate backup Tomáš Vaclík suffered an injury in the warm-up, Pastor made his first team debut by playing the full 90 minutes of a 4–0 home loss against Chelsea.

International career
Pastor represented Spain at under-17 level in the 2017 FIFA U-17 World Cup, acting as a backup to Álvaro Fernández as his side finished second in the tournament.

References

External links

2000 births
Living people
Sportspeople from the Province of Córdoba (Spain)
Spanish footballers
Footballers from Andalusia
Association football goalkeepers
Primera Federación players
Segunda División B players
Sevilla Atlético players
Sevilla FC players
CD Castellón footballers
Spain youth international footballers